Mirrorwriting is the debut studio album by British singer Jamie Woon. It was released in Europe on 18 April 2011 through Polydor Records. The album started to receive hype after Woon ended fourth on BBC's Sound of 2011 poll. It was preceded by the lead single, "Night Air" on 22 October 2010.

Critical reception 
Paul Clarke of BBC Music gave the album a positive review by saying: "Things would probably be quite different for Woon had he'd got his act together sooner. In 2007, his fragile cover of an old folk spiritual placed him pretty much alone at the crossroads between rural blues and urban electronica, a 20-something Robert Johnson from London who'd sold his soul to dubstep instead of the Devil. Today, though, he shares this space with The xx and James Blake; and overshadowed by The xx's Mercury Prize victory and Blake's own debut album of earlier in 2011, Woon's music could now be in danger of sounding wearily familiar rather than darkly mysterious".

Commercial performance
 UK sales stand at 30,000 copies according to The Guardian.

Track listing

Charts

Year-end charts

References

2011 debut albums
Polydor Records albums